The World Weightlifting Championships is an international weightlifting competition, currently held annually (except for years of the Summer Olympic Games) by the International Weightlifting Federation (IWF). The predecessor organization of the IWF was founded in 1905, but World Championship events began before its foundation. The first recognized World Championship event was held in 1891, and was won by Edward Lawrence Levy of England.

Athletes today compete in a total of 20 weight categories (10 for men and 10 for women):

Men categories: 55 kg, 61 kg, 67 kg, 73 kg, 81 kg, 89 kg, 96 kg, 102 kg, 109 kg and +109 kg.
Women categories: 45 kg, 49 kg, 55 kg, 59 kg, 64 kg, 71 kg, 76 kg, 81 kg, 87 kg and +87 kg.

Competitions

Men

 The weightlifting tournaments held during Summer Olympics in 1964, 1968, 1972, 1976, 1980 and 1984 are counted as World Weightlifting Championships of the corresponding year.

Women

Combined

All-time medal table

Total
All-time big (total) medal count below updated after the 2022 World Weightlifting Championships.

Big and small medals
All-time big (total) and small (snatch, clean & jerk, and press) medal count below updated after the 2022 World Weightlifting Championships.

 Names in italic are national entities that no longer exist.

Multiple medalists
The table shows those who have won at least 5 gold medals in total result. Boldface denotes active weightlifters and highest medal count among all weightlifters (including these who not included in these tables) per type.

See also
Weightlifting at the Summer Olympics
List of World Championships medalists in weightlifting (men)
List of World Championships medalists in weightlifting (women)
IWF Youth World Weightlifting Championships
IWF Junior World Weightlifting Championships

References

External links
International Weightlifting Federation (IWF)
Weightlifting World Championships Seniors Statistics 
Database IWRP

 
Weightlifting competitions
World championships